Viktor Pogozhev (born 30 September 1941) is a Soviet diver. He competed at the 1964 Summer Olympics and the 1968 Summer Olympics.

References

1941 births
Living people
Soviet male divers
Olympic divers of the Soviet Union
Divers at the 1964 Summer Olympics
Divers at the 1968 Summer Olympics
Place of birth missing (living people)